James Dempsey (6 February 1917 – 12 May 1982) was a Scottish Labour Party politician who was Member of Parliament for Coatbridge and Airdrie from 1959 until his death.

Background
Dempsey was educated at Holy Family School, Mossend, the Co-operative College in Loughborough, and at the National Council of Labour Colleges. He was a clerk with a haulage firm and a councillor on Lanarkshire County Council from 1945. He later worked as a lecturer on political economy and a writer on local government.

Parliament
In 1959, Dempsey was elected the Member of Parliament for Coatbridge and Airdrie. His maiden speech, on 28 October 1959, was on the subject of unemployment. His final appearance was asking a question about the Christmas payments for pensioners, on 18 January 1982. A devout Catholic, he opposed the Abortion Act 1967.

Amid a series of health problems, he announced that he would not contest the 1983 general election, but died from a heart attack before then, on 12 May 1982, at his home in Bellshill. In the resulting by-election, the Labour Party held his seat with Tom Clarke.

Family
Dempsey's brother John Dempsey (Bellshill) was a footballer for Ipswich town (England), Hamilton, Queen of the South, Newry Town (Ireland) and Cowdenbeath. John was also a football scout after his playing career, with Hamilton Academical, and more famously Glasgow Celtic for 11 years; from 1965 to 1976 he served under the late Jock Stein during the club's win in the 1967 European Cup Final.

Dempsey and his wife, Jane, had six children. His son Brian is a businessman and a former director of Celtic F.C.

References 

Times Guide to the House of Commons, 1966 & 1979

External links 
 

1917 births
1982 deaths
20th-century Roman Catholics
Alumni of the Co-operative College
Clerks
Councillors in Scotland
Scottish Labour MPs
Scottish Roman Catholics
UK MPs 1959–1964
UK MPs 1964–1966
UK MPs 1966–1970
UK MPs 1970–1974
UK MPs 1974
UK MPs 1974–1979
UK MPs 1979–1983